Aztec Records is an independent British record label. It is specializes in electronic and pop music, in the subgenres of Synthpop, Synthwave and Retrowave following the 80's.  It was founded in 2010 by Laura Fares and Ariel Amejeiras.

Label Development 
The record company has developed and released acts such as Bright Light Bright Light, NINA, LAU, Zenith Volt, Sunglasses Kid, Owlle, Gryff, Thought Beings, Primo the Alien, Oblique, Eutropic, Power Rob, Surrender, Wyve, Mickey Cupid, Traverse Town, Maighread and many others.

Bright Light Bright Light is Welsh composer/producer and DJ Rod Thomas. His album "Make Me Believe In Hope", was recorded during two years with different collaborators: Andy Chatterley (Kylie / Nerina Pallot), Boom Bip (Neon Neon) and The Invisible Men (Jessie J). 

Laura Fares discovered and developed NINA in 2010, a German singer-songwriter based in Berlin, with whom she formed a band until 2019. Aztec Records released NINA’s first single "Take Me Away", a pop dance song, in 2011. The label has also produced and released NINA’s first two albums ‘Sleepwalking’ (2018) and ‘Synthian’ (2020), with producers like Richard X, Oscillian, Ricky Wilde and Sunglasses Kid.

In 2012 Aztec Records teamed up with EQ Music Blog to organize the first Poptronik Festival in Sitges, Spain, featuring Andy Bell of Erasure, Monarchy, Simon Curtis, Markus Riva, superstar producer Fernando Garibay and other international artists, and a compilation was released for that event.

The label has more than 25 international artists on their roster and releases new music weekly. The label also releases different compilations regularly, like “Pure Synthwave” which was curated by NINA herself, “Pure Darkwave”, “Pure Retrowave”, “Pure Synthpop” and more recently “Pure Latin Synth”, that inspired Ariel and Laura to start a Latin American branch, based in Argentina.

In 2020 Aztec Records launched their Spanish speaking sub-label called Aztec Latin, which specialises in pop and electronic music purely in Spanish. Artists include Ignacia, Jaz Oil, Locker, Verona, Caseti, Mandy Barrón, Kush Mama, The Broken Flowers Project and others.

Aztec Music Publishing is the publishing branch of Aztec Records. It began in 2014 with the idea of expanding its catalog and managing it properly to place it in films, television, games and commercials. Placements include brands such as Adidas, Hugo Boss, Mercedes Benz, Uniqlo, Victoria's Secret and some others.

Artists

Discography

References

External links 
 Official Web Site

Electropop
Synth-pop record labels
Synthwave
Record labels based in London